The Herblock Prize for editorial cartooning is an annual $15,000 after-tax cash prize, and a sterling silver Tiffany trophy. Designed "to encourage editorial cartooning as an essential tool for preserving the rights of the American people through freedom of speech and the right of expression," it is named for the editorial cartoonist Herblock and sponsored by The Herb Block Foundation.

The rotating three-judge panel that determines the award-winner is typically composed of the previous year's winner, another editorial cartoonist, and a scholar of editorial cartooning. The award is typically presented some time between March and May of each year, at the Library of Congress.

Each award presentation is accompanied by a guest lecturer who discusses contemporary social issues "in the spirit of Herblock." Previous Herblock Prize guest lecturers include Ben Bradlee, President Barack Obama, Sandra Day O’Connor, Tom Brokaw, Tim Russert, Ted Koppel, George Stevens, Jr., Jim Lehrer, Garry Trudeau, Gwen Ifill, and Bob Woodward.

Finalists for the award have been named since 2011; they receive a $5,000 after-tax prize.

History 
When Herb Block died in October 2001, he left $50 million with instructions to create a foundation to support charitable and educational programs that help promote and sustain the causes he championed during his 72 years of cartooning. The Herb Block Foundation is committed to defending the basic freedoms guaranteed all Americans, combating all forms of discrimination and prejudice, and improving the conditions of the poor and underprivileged through the creation or support of charitable and educational programs with the same goals. The Foundation is also committed to improving educational opportunities to deserving students through post-secondary education scholarships and to promoting editorial cartooning through continuing research. The Herb Block Foundation awarded its first grants and the annual Herblock Prize in editorial cartooning in 2004.

In 2011, Ann Telnaes became the first female Herblock Prize finalist. In 2012, Matt Bors became the first alternative-weekly cartoonist to win the Herblock Prize. in 2014, Jen Sorensen became the first female Herblock Prize award-winner.

Award recipients

Award finalists

References

External links 
 

American journalism awards
Awards established in 2004
Editorial cartooning awards
2004 establishments in the United States
Annual events in the United States